Rupert Wyatt (born 26 October 1972) is an English screenwriter, director and producer. He made his directorial debut with the 2008 film The Escapist, which premiered at the Sundance Film Festival. His second film was the 2011 blockbuster Rise of the Planet of the Apes. His third film was the 2019 sci-fi film Captive State. He also directed the first two episodes of the television adaptation of The Mosquito Coast in 2021, as well as serving as an executive producer on the series.

Early life
Wyatt was born and raised near Winchester in Hampshire. He was educated at the Dragon School, Oxford and Winchester College, Winchester.

Career

Producing
Wyatt is the founder of the film collective Picture Farm, which has produced numerous shorts, documentaries and features, including the Sundance Award-winning documentary Dark Days.

Directing
He also co-wrote and directed the British prison escape thriller The Escapist (2008), starring Brian Cox, Damian Lewis, Dominic Cooper, Joseph Fiennes, Seu Jorge, Steven Mackintosh and Liam Cunningham. The film premiered at the Sundance Film Festival in January 2008, was nominated for eight international film awards, and was the winner of two. In March 2010, he was selected to direct Rise of the Planet of the Apes, a reboot of the Planet of the Apes franchise, which was based on a screenplay by Rick Jaffa and Amanda Silver. The film was released on 5 August 2011 to mostly positive reviews  and grossed more than $481 million worldwide.

Wyatt was to be the director of 20th Century Fox's X-Men spin-off film Gambit, to be released on 7 October 2016, but dropped out due to scheduling conflicts.

He directed the 2019 sci-fi film Captive State, which he co-wrote with Erica Beeney.

Personal life
Wyatt currently lives between Los Angeles and Hudson, New York with his wife, filmmaker Erica Beeney, and their three children.

Filmography
Film

Television

References

External links
 

1972 births
Living people
English writers
English film directors
Mass media people from Exeter
English cinematographers
English film producers
English screenwriters
English male screenwriters
English expatriates in the United States
People educated at Winchester College